The Italian Society of Silviculture and Forest Ecology (or SISEF), established in 1995, is a non-profit cultural association promoting the diffusion of scientific forest culture in Italy, and all over the world.

Mission
The mission of SISEF is to promote researches on: 
 structure, functionality and sustainable management of forest ecosystems 
 forest habitat, forest biodiversity and genetics
 dendro-ecology, silviculture, wood production and technology, forest harvesting
 landscape, forest ecosystem services

SISEF aims also to promote

 Coordination, strengthening and networking of forest research
 Forest education

SISEF supports communication among its members interested in studying forest science and forestry issues, covering all aspects of an interdisciplinary science, including biology, ecology, silviculture, wood production, climate change, environmental and socio-economy aspects.

SISEF is accredited by ANVUR, the Italian National Agency for the evaluation of Universities and Research Institutes; and is a member of AISSA, the Italian Association of Scientific Agriculture Societies.

SISEF's headquarters is in Viterbo, Italy, at the Department for Innovation in Biological, Agro-Food and Forest Systems, of Tuscia University.

Members
All the Italian and foreign researchers interested in the activities carried out by the Society can be members of SISEF. The SISEF members elect every two years five members of the Board, one Secretary and one President. Three auditor board members are also elected for supervising the SISEF budgeting. An annual fee is due by the SISEF members. Currently, SISEF has about 260 members.

Board

Past presidents

Research groups

SISEF coordinates research groups related to specific forest issues

Congresses
SISEF organizes a National Congress every two years, in order to create an opportunity for interaction and exchange between researchers and stakeholders.

 11° SISEF National Congress - "La foresta che cambia. Ricerca, qualità della vita e opportunità in un paese che cambia" - Rome 10–13 October 2017
 10° SISEF National Congress - "Sostenere il Pianeta, Boschi per la vita" - Florence, 15–18 September 2015
 9º SISEF National Congress – “Multifunzionalità degli ecosistemi forestali montani: sfide e opportunità per la ricerca e lo sviluppo” - Bolzano, 16–19 September 2013
 8º SISEF National Congress – “Selvicoltura e conservazione del suolo: la sfida Europea per una gestione territoriale integrata” - Rende (CS), 04-7 October 2011
 7º SISEF National Congress – “Sviluppo e adattamento, naturalità e conservazione: opportunità per un sistema forestale in transizione” - Pesche (IS), 29 Set – 3 October 2009
 6º SISEF National Congress – “La Gestione delle Foreste tra Cambiamenti Globali e Azioni Locali” -Arezzo, 25–27 September 2007
 5º SISEF National Congress – “Foreste e Società: Cambiamenti, Conflitti, Sinergie” - Grugliasco (TO), 27–29 September 2005
 4º SISEF National Congress – “Meridiani foreste” - Rifreddo (PZ), 07-10 October 2003
 3º SISEF National Congress - “Alberi e Foreste per il Nuovo Millennio” - Viterbo, 15–18 October 2001
 2º SISEF National Congress – “Applicazioni e Prospettive per la Ricerca Forestale Italiana”- Bologna, 20–22 October 1999
 1º SISEF National Congress – “La Ricerca Italiana per le Foreste e la Selvicoltura” - Legnaro (PD), 04-6 June 1997

Journals

SISEF publishes two scholarly journals:

i Forest is an Open Access, peer-reviewed online journal. The journal encompasses a broad range of research aspects concerning forest science: forest ecology, biodiversity/genetics and ecophysiology, silviculture, forest inventory and planning, forest protection and monitoring, forest harvesting, landscape ecology, forest history, wood technology. iForest is freely and universally accessible online. It has been selected for coverage by Thomson Reuters Web of Science (Impact Factor 2013 JCR: 1.150) and SCOPUS.

Forest@ is an Open Access, peer-reviewed online journal published in Italian. It aims at disseminating scientific articles, short communications, technical reports, review papers about forest and environmental sciences.

References

External links
 Sisef.org
 Sisef.org
 Sisefcongressi.org
 Sisef.it

Forestry in Italy
Forest conservation organizations
Scientific societies based in Italy
Viterbo